Riccioni is a surname. Notable people with the surname include:

Enzo Riccioni (died 1964), Italian cinematographer
Marco Riccioni (born 1997), Italian rugby union player

See also
Riccione

Italian-language surnames